Cole Sillinger (born May 16, 2003) is a Canadian professional ice hockey center for the Columbus Blue Jackets of the National Hockey League (NHL). Sillinger was selected by the Blue Jackets 12th overall in the 2021 NHL Entry Draft.

Playing career
Sillinger was selected 11th overall by the Medicine Hat Tigers of the Western Hockey League in the 2018 WHL Bantam Draft. He debuted and appeared in 4 games with the Tigers in 2018–19, tallying two assists. Sillinger was fourth among points for the Tigers in 2019–20, scoring 22 goals and 53 points in 48 appearances with the team.

In 2020, due to the COVID-19 pandemic delaying the return of the Western Hockey League, the Tigers agreed to send Sillinger to the Sioux Falls Stampede in the United States Hockey League on a one-year loan agreement. During the 2020–21 season, Sillinger led the Stampede in points, garnering 24 goals and 46 points in 31 games played. He earned 2021 USHL Rookie of the Year honors by a unanimous vote of league general managers for his performance and was elected to the first all-USHL rookie team and all-USHL third team.

The NHL Central Scouting Bureau ranked Sillinger as the 10th-best North American skater eligible ahead of the 2021 NHL Entry Draft. On July 23, 2021, Sillinger was selected 12th overall by the Blue Jackets in the 2021 draft.

On March 13, 2022, Sillinger scored his first NHL career hat trick with the Blue Jackets against the Vegas Golden Knights.

Personal life
Cole Sillinger was born in Columbus, Ohio on May 16, 2003, the third son to Karla (née Dreger) Sillinger and former National Hockey League forward Mike Sillinger. His father played professional hockey for the Columbus Blue Jackets at the time of his birth. The family briefly resided in Phoenix, Arizona, St. Louis, Missouri and Garden City, New York, as Mike's career led him on to play for the Phoenix Coyotes, St. Louis Blues, and New York Islanders, respectively. Sillinger grew up in Regina, Saskatchewan and represents Hockey Canada. He has two older brothers that play hockey. Owen Sillinger is a member of Columbus affiliate Cleveland Monsters in the American Hockey League and Lukas skates with Arizona State University.

Career statistics

Regular season and playoffs

International

References

External links
 

2003 births
Living people
Canadian ice hockey centres
Columbus Blue Jackets draft picks
Columbus Blue Jackets players
Ice hockey players from Ohio
Ice hockey people from Saskatchewan
Medicine Hat Tigers players
Sioux Falls Stampede players
National Hockey League first-round draft picks
Sportspeople from Columbus, Ohio
Sportspeople from Regina, Saskatchewan